John Patrick McVitty (December 26, 1926 – April 21, 1956) was an American stock car racing driver who competed in the NASCAR Grand National Series. He was born in  Mamaroneck, New York.

McVitty's total earning were considered to be $800 ($ when adjusted for inflation). His average start was in 18th place and his average finish was in 15th place. All of McVitty's races were done in Chevrolet vehicles. At the 1956 Wilkes County 160, a fuel pump problem caused McVitty to retire from the race; he would be killed in a racing accident thirteen days later at Langhorne Speedway.

Motorsports career results

NASCAR
(key) (Bold – Pole position awarded by qualifying time. Italics – Pole position earned by points standings or practice time. * – Most laps led.)

Grand National Series

References

External links
 

1926 births
1956 deaths
NASCAR drivers
People from Mamaroneck, New York
Racing drivers from New York (state)
Sports deaths in Pennsylvania